Tulips is a series of sculptures by American artist Jeff Koons, made between 1995 and 2004. There are five unique versions. One sculpture is part of the collection of The Broad in Los Angeles, California.

References

1990s sculptures
2000s sculptures
Collection of The Broad
Sculptures by Jeff Koons